Arthur Edwards (November 23, 1834 – March 20, 1901) was an American cleric and editor.

Early life
Edwards was born in Norwalk, Ohio. When he was 7 years old, he was adopted by his uncle, and moved to Michigan.

Professional life
He graduated from Ohio Wesleyan University in 1858 and entered the ministry in that same year. In the American Civil War, he served as chaplain of the First Michigan Infantry until after the Battle of Gettysburg. He participated in 18 battles all together and was offered a brevet rank of colonel. However, he resigned from the army and in 1864, he became assistant editor of the Northwestern Christian Advocate of Chicago, Illinois. From 1872 until his death, he was the editor.

He married Caroline Maria Whitehead on January 24, 1868, and they had three children.

He died at his home in Detroit on March 20, 1901.

References

1834 births
1901 deaths
American religious writers
Union Army chaplains
People from Norwalk, Ohio
Ohio Wesleyan University alumni
19th-century American clergy